is a former Japanese football player. He played for Japan national team.

Club career
Ishigami was born in Shizuoka Prefecture on November 4, 1957. After graduating from high school, he joined the Prefectural Leagues club Yamaha Motors in 1976. The club was promoted to the Regional Leagues in 1977 and to the Japan Soccer League 1979. The club won the league championship in 1987–88. The club also won the 1982 Emperor's Cup. He retired in 1990. He was twice selected for the Best Eleven.

National team career
On September 30, 1984, Ishigami debuted for Japan national team against South Korea. He played at 1986 World Cup qualification and 1986 Asian Games. He played 12 games for Japan until 1986.

Club statistics

National team statistics

References

External links
 
 Japan National Football Team Database

1957 births
Living people
Association football people from Shizuoka Prefecture
Japanese footballers
Japan international footballers
Japan Soccer League players
Júbilo Iwata players
Association football defenders